St. Mark's School is a coeducational, Episcopal preparatory school, situated on  in Southborough, Massachusetts,  from Boston. St. Mark's was founded in 1865 as an all-boys school by Joseph Burnett, who developed and marketed Burnett Vanilla Extract. Girls have attended since 1978. St. Mark's is a member of the Independent School League and one of five prep schools known collectively as St. Grottlesex.

History

St. Mark's is one of the first New England schools founded on the British model, as opposed to academies such as Phillips Academy and Phillips Exeter Academy or entrepreneurial schools such as The Hill School.

The school attracted many members of Boston Brahmin and New York Knickerbocker families.

Arrival of William Greenough Thayer
The school faced initial challenges, including financial difficulties and the instability resulting from employing four different headmasters in its first seventeen years of existence, followed by the appointment of William E. Peck in 1882. Peck was often in conflict with the trustees, until 1894, when he resigned and founded Pomfret School, taking a number of students and teachers with him. It wasn't until the appointment of Headmaster William Greenough Thayer (who had taught for five years at slightly younger athletic archrival Groton School) in 1894 that St. Mark's began to experience stability. Thayer led the school until 1930. News of his pending retirement was reported by Time Magazine in 1929.

Thayer's knack for attracting socially well-connected families proved durable. His admissions policy, modeled on that of English Public Schools, prioritized admissions on the basis of when one's parents had “put one's name down”. In practice this led over time to a school dominated by sons of alumni. Girls were not admitted until 1978.

St. Mark's social standing did not pass unnoticed in wider America. F. Scott Fitzgerald, in his 1920 novel “This Side of Paradise”, identified St. Mark's as a school which “...recruited from Boston and the Knickerbocker families of New York.” 

Sports were emphasized. In the early years masters played with boys on the same teams, and the traditional football rivalry with Groton was slowly expanded to include the English game of “fives”, baseball, and other sports.

Parkman period
With Thayer's retirement in 1930, Headmaster Francis Parkman was chosen to lead the school. Parkman brought the noted poet Richard Eberhart to the school as an English teacher from 1933 to 1941, and W. H. Auden for a brief appointment in 1939. Auden described St. Mark's to a friend as a school that "sets out to be a sort of American Eton”. Auden was reportedly struck by the “dimness of the boys and the reverence of America for the average.” Eberhart briefly memorializes Auden's time at St. Mark's with his poem “To W. H. Auden on his Fiftieth Birthday”, in which he mentions the school in passing.

Parkman left the school in 1942 – to enlist in the army – and never returned, although he remained active in independent school policy all his life, eventually rising to the presidency of the National Association of Independent Schools in Boston.

World War II
World War II changed the campus. In 1942 Parkman was replaced by William Brewster, an Episcopal clergyman who remained only until 1947. Brewster's democratizing tendencies were abetted by exigencies of the war effort. The school was forced to cope with labor shortages that forced students to work in dormitories and in the dining hall. The maids and domestic help vanished with the war's labor shortage and never returned.

Twentieth-century elitism
Headmaster Brewster disliked the clubby atmosphere of the school, reforming admission policies during his brief tenure. Famously hearing one alumnus describe St. Mark's as the best club he had ever joined, Brewster subsequently fought to make admissions merit-based, and expanded financial assistance. His successors continued this battle. The school began to focus more on academic as opposed to social merits, and by the late fifties was admitting only about one applicant out of five.

In 1948, Headmaster William Wyatt Barber Jr. assumed leadership of St. Mark's. Teaching Ancient Greek and coaching hockey, Headmaster Barber emphasized character building. Under Mr. Barber, the school offered scholarships to students from military or moderate income families.

Challenge of modernization
In 1968, Edward T. "Ned" Hall became Headmaster. Beginning in the early 1970s, St. Mark's relaxed many traditional, formal requirements of school life. St. Mark's reduced the number of required chapel services from six days per week to five. St. Mark's reduced the number of sit down meals. The School introduced a "December Week" of alternative course offerings, and experiments in co-education. Headmaster Hall announced his resignation at the beginning of the 1973–74 school year, effective the following July.

In 1974, the trustees hired Rev. Robert R. "Red" Hansel, a former chaplain at St. George's School. Hansel's four-year tenure was controversial. Changes under Rev. Hansel, like coeducation, were arduous. In 1972 girls initially attended the newly established Southborough School, funded largely by St. Mark's. In 1977 the Southborough girls' school was dissolved. St. Mark's absorbed many of its students and faculty.

Academics

Between 2010 and 2014, the most popular college destinations were Northeastern (12), Georgetown (11), Hamilton (11), Boston College (10), and Lehigh (10).

St. Mark's has an average SAT score of 1360. The revised curriculum eliminated Advanced Placement classes and installed Advanced classes, courses unique to St. Mark's which, depending on the course itself, may or may not align with the College Board's Advanced Placement classes.

Programs

St. Mark's offers several unique programs to its students and others affiliated with the school. The programs are as follows:
 Lion Term 
 St. Mark's Saturdays 
 Gray Colloquium 
 LEO: Official Academic Journal 
 STEM Fellowship 
 Global Citizenship 
 Career Day

Facilities

Notable in the Thayer vision was the cloister-style construction of the school, with interconnected buildings forming an architectural ensemble in which the entire school was essentially under one roof, in many cases with dorms on the upper floors of the buildings and classrooms and other academic halls in the lower floors. Because of this, the school touts the "school under one roof" concept as a unique strength, though more recent buildings no longer fit that criterion.

The school as it appeared in the early 1950s is portrayed under the name "St. Bart's" in the novel Pnin by Vladimir Nabokov, whose son Dmitri attended the school. Some interior shots of St. Mark's can be seen in the film School Ties (1992), which was filmed at Middlesex School and St. Mark's.

Athletics
St. Mark's has historically been strong at ice hockey, and a number of its alumni have gone on to careers in the National Hockey League. The boys' ice hockey team won NEPSAC Championships in 1992, 2015, 2016; ISL Eberhart Division Championships in 1976, 2001, 2002, 2003, 2015, 2020, 2022; ISL Championships in 1981, 1982, 1983, 1984, 1985, 1986, 1987, 1988, 1989, 1990, 1991, 1992, 1993, 1994, 1997, 1998, 1999, 2000; and Private School League Championships in 1959, 1960, 1961 and 1962.

In 2006 and 2007, St. Mark's boys' cross-country was the New England Division IV Champion, while the girls' cross-country team was the runner-up in 2007. After finishing second in the New Englands in 2008, 2009, and 2010, St. Mark's boys' cross-country had an undefeated season in 2011 and went on to win the ISL Championships and New England Division II Championship. St. Mark's boys' cross-country replicated this feat in 2013, capturing the ISL and New England Championships.

St. Mark's has played the Groton School since 1886, making it one of the oldest athletic rivalries in the United States.

St. Mark's has educated a few Olympic athletes, including Truxtun Hare in track and field, Suzanne King in cross-country skiing, Scott Young in ice hockey, Greg Brown in ice hockey, and Chris Sahs in rowing.

The girls' field hockey team has a history of winning the New England Championships. Teams have won in 1992, 1997, 2012 and 2013.

In 1951 and 1954 the Lions were Private School League champions in basketball. St. Mark's also won ISL championships in 1972, 1999, 2006, 2008, 2009, 2011, and 2012, and were New England champions in 1972, 1973, 1999, 2006, 2008, 2009, and 2012.

Notable alumni

St. Mark's educated Robert Lowell and Lost Generation literary figure Harry Crosby, both of whom wrote for the school literary magazine as students. Artist William Congdon began painting there. Henry Demarest Lloyd, a notable nineteenth-century progressive and generally considered the father of investigative journalism, studied at St. Mark's. Astronaut Story Musgrave is an alumnus, but his name was added to the official plaque at a later date. Former CBS news chief and the Nation editor Blair Clark, Washington Post editor Benjamin Bradlee, Harvard professor and Net Impact faculty founder Mark Albion, and more recently comedian Mike Birbiglia, Harvard professor and White House consultant Gregory Ciottone, and Motley Fool co-founder David Gardner are alumni.

References

External links 

 

Private high schools in Massachusetts
Independent School League
Episcopal schools in the United States
Educational institutions established in 1865
Boarding schools in Massachusetts
Schools in Worcester County, Massachusetts
Southborough, Massachusetts
 
1865 establishments in Massachusetts